Josephine d'Arby (born 3 October 1972) is a Welsh television presenter and painter from Newport, Wales. She presented a number of high-profile shows and in 1999 became the youngest British woman to host her own chat show, doing so on Channel 5.

Biography
Josie d'Arby was born and raised in Newport, Monmouthshire. As a teenager she attended the Anna Scher Theatre in London before winning a place at the Royal Academy of Dramatic Art. She is of Jamaican heritage.

Career

D'Arby began a presenting career while still a student of acting at RADA. From 1994 to 1997, she presented on CBBC and on SMart from 1996 to 1998, and had her own show, Josie, on Channel 5 in 1999. She presented a number of high-profile programmes including the Bigger Breakfast (a spin-off from The Big Breakfast) and Top of the Pops. Recently, she has been a presenter on BBC Young Musician of the Year, BBC Cardiff Singer of the World, Songs of Praise, BBC Four's Choir of the Year and BBC Proms 2021.

Her first high-profile dramatic acting role was as series regular WPC Jodie Finn, in the BBC drama Merseybeat. From February 2005, she starred as Peally Maghti, one of the presenters of the BBC's award-winning spoof of 1980s science programming Look Around You.

She was one of the six cast members in Channel 4 sketch series Spoons, and has made guest appearances in BBC comedy series Miranda and appears as herself in the Working Title movie Blackball with Vince Vaughan.

She has also worked in radio, as a co-presenter of The Steve Wright Show for BBC Radio 2 and has presented a number of documentaries for BBC Radio 4. She  also presented a live edition of The Choir for BBC Radio 3 and in 2017 hosted the BBC Radio 2 Young Choristers of the Year final. In November 2011, she wrote and directed the off-beat New York Comedy A Magpie in the Mirror. The festival arts documentary National Eisteddfod 2017 with Josie d'Arby was broadcast in the summer of 2017 on BBC Four and BBC Two Wales. She regularly presents Proms in the Park.

Continuing her diverse career in television and the arts, she has also appeared on the stage. In 2012 she wrote and directed the play, The Newport Monologues, about life in her hometown, which opened to rave reviews from press and audience in September 2012. She produced and directed the arts project Private View, which featured the actor Michael Sheen.

D'Arby won a Royal Television Society award for her work presenting the current affairs programme Inside Out for BBC West.

On 23 August 2018, d'Arby hosted the final of Eurovision Young Musicians 2018 at the Usher Hall in Edinburgh alongside Petroc Trelawny.

On 24th October 2022, she was part of the blue team on 'Bargain Hunt: BBC 100th Birthday Special' to commemorate the BBC's 100th Anniversary. Her team mate was Owain Wyn Evans and the red team were Tony Blackburn and Gyles Brandreth. The red team made a profit of £10, while Josie's team lost with minus £45.

Charity work

In Summer 2012, d'Arby was one of eight core walkers who walked 200 miles from South to North Wales in aid of Wales Air Ambulance charity.

She was a celebrity ambassador for the British Red Cross for whom she has travelled to both South Africa and Cambodia and been a guest speaker at their national assembly. She and Cerys Matthews hosted the Children in Need section for Wales. d'Arby often hosts Proms in the Park for BBC Four.

D'Arby was name-checked in the YouTube hit video by M.J. Delany "Newport (Ymerodraeth State of Mind)" with the explanation: "Yes, it's strange, we didn't know either – Thank you Wikipedia." She appeared in the 2011 video for the song, along with several other Welsh celebrities, made for Comic Relief.

She worked closely with Survivors Fund (SURF), a charity that supports survivors of the Rwandan genocide of 1994.

References

External links
 Home page
 

Welsh television actresses
Welsh television presenters
Welsh women television presenters
Welsh soap opera actresses
Alumni of the Anna Scher Theatre School
Alumni of the London School of Journalism
Alumni of RADA
People from Newport, Wales
1972 births
Living people
Welsh people of Jamaican descent
Black British television personalities
21st-century Welsh actresses
20th-century Welsh actresses
Top of the Pops presenters